Pekwan (also, Pack-wans, Pak-wan, Pank-wans, Pec-quan, Pek-wan, and Tirip'ama, Yurok: Pekwon ) is a former Yurok settlement in Humboldt County, California. It is located on the Lower Klamath River at the mouth of Pecwan Creek, at an elevation of 85 feet (26 m).

References

Former settlements in Humboldt County, California
Former Native American populated places in California
Yurok villages